Lychas jonesae, also known as the ochre scorpion, is a species of scorpion in the Buthidae family. It is native to Australia, and was first described in 1925 by Australian paleontologist and Western Australian Museum curator Ludwig Glauert.

Distribution
The species occurs on Australia’s Western Plateau and in the Murray-Darling Basin.

References

 

 
jonesae
Scorpions of Australia
Endemic fauna of Australia
Fauna of South Australia
Fauna of Western Australia
Animals described in 1925
Taxa named by Ludwig Glauert